Kirdy Stevens (1920 - October 20, 2012)  was an American pornographic film director.

He was inducted into the XRCO Hall of Fame in 2001 and the AVN Hall of Fame in 2003.

Stevens died of pneumonia on October 20, 2012 at age 92.

References

External links

American pornographic film directors
1920 births
2012 deaths
Deaths from pneumonia in California
Film directors from San Francisco